Victor Luitpold Berger (February 28, 1860August 7, 1929) was an Austrian–American socialist politician and journalist who was a founding member of the Social Democratic Party of America and its successor, the Socialist Party of America. Born in the Austrian Empire and present-day Romania, Berger immigrated to the United States as a young man and became an important and influential socialist journalist in Wisconsin. He helped establish the so-called Sewer Socialist movement. Also a politician, in 1910, he was elected as the first Socialist to the U.S. House of Representatives, representing a district in Milwaukee, Wisconsin.

In 1919, Berger was convicted of violating the Espionage Act of 1917 for publicizing his anti-interventionist views and as a result was denied the seat to which he had been twice elected in the House of Representatives. The verdict was eventually overturned by the Supreme Court in 1921 in Berger v. United States, and Berger was elected to three successive terms in the 1920s.

Early years
Berger was born into a Jewish family on February 28, 1860, in Nieder-Rehbach, Austrian Empire (today in Romania). He was the son of Julia and Ignatz Berger. He attended the Gymnasium at Leutschau (today in Slovakia), and the major universities of Budapest and Vienna. In 1878, he immigrated to the United States with his parents, settling near Bridgeport, Connecticut. 

Berger's wife, Meta, later claimed that Berger had left Austria-Hungary to avoid conscription into the military.

In 1881, Berger settled in Milwaukee, Wisconsin, home to a large population of German Americans and a very active labor movement. Berger joined the Socialist Labor Party (then headed by Daniel de Leon), and became the editor of two newspapers: Vorwärts [Forward] and Die Wahrheit [The Truth]. Berger taught German in the public school system. His future father-in-law was the school commissioner. 

In 1897, he married a former student, Meta Schlichting, an active socialist organizer in Milwaukee. For many years, she was a member of the University of Wisconsin Board of Regents. The couple raised two daughters, Doris (who later went on to write television shows such as General Hospital, with her husband Frank) and Elsa, speaking only German in the home. The parents were strongly oriented to European culture.

Socialist organizing
Berger was credited by trade union leader Eugene V. Debs for having won him over to the cause of socialism. Jailed for six months for violating a federal anti-strike injunction in the 1894 strike of the American Railway Union, Debs turned to reading:

Books and pamphlets and letters from socialists came by every mail and I began to read and think and dissect the anatomy of the system in which workingmen, however organized, could be shattered and battered and splintered on a single stroke [...] It was at this time, when the first glimmerings of socialism were beginning to penetrate, that Victor L. Berger — and I have loved him ever since — came to Woodstock [prison], as if a providential instrument, and delivered the first impassioned message of socialism I had ever heard — the very first to set the wires humming in my system. As a souvenir of that visit there is in my library a volume of Capital by Karl Marx, inscribed with the compliments of Victor L. Berger, which I cherish as a token of priceless value.

In 1896, Berger was a delegate to the People's Party Convention in St. Louis.

Berger was short and stocky, with a studious demeanor, and had both a self-deprecating sense of humor and a volatile temper. Although loyal to friends, he was strongly opinionated and intolerant of dissenting views. His ideological sparring partner and comrade Morris Hillquit later recalled of Berger that

He was sublimely egotistical, but somehow his egotism did not smack of conceit and was not offensive. It was the expression of deep and naive faith in himself, and this unshakable faith was one of the mainsprings of his power over men.

Berger was a founding member of the Social Democracy of America in 1897 and led the split of the "political action" faction of that organization to form the Social Democratic Party of America (SDP) in 1898. He was a member of the governing National Executive Committee of the SDP for its entire duration.

Berger was a founder of the Socialist Party of America in 1901 and played a critical role in the negotiations with an east coast dissident faction of the Socialist Labor Party in the establishment of this new political party. Berger was regarded as one of the party's leading revisionist Marxists, an advocate of the trade union-oriented and incremental politics of Eduard Bernstein. He advocated the use of electoral politics to implement reforms and thus gradually build a collectivist society.

Berger was a man of the written word and back room negotiation, not a notable public speaker. He retained a heavy German accent and had a voice which did not project well. As a rule he did not accept outdoor speaking engagements and was a poor campaigner, preferring one-on-one relationships to mass oratory. Berger was, however, a newspaper editorialist par excellence. Throughout his life he published and edited a number of different papers, including the German language Vorwärts ("Forward") (1892–1911), the Social-Democratic Herald (1901–1913), and the Milwaukee Leader (1911–1929).

First term in Congress

Berger ran for Congress and lost in 1904 before winning Wisconsin's 5th congressional district seat in 1910 as the first Socialist to serve in the United States Congress. In Congress, he focused on issues related to the District of Columbia and also more radical proposals, including eliminating the President's veto, abolishing the Senate, and the social takeover of major industries. Berger gained national publicity for his old-age pension bill, the first of its kind introduced into Congress.  Less than two weeks after the Titanic passenger ship disaster, Berger introduced a bill in Congress providing for the nationalization of the radio-wireless systems.  A practical socialist, Berger argued that the wireless chaos which was one of the features of the Titanic disaster had demonstrated the need for a government-owned wireless system.

Although he did not win re-election in 1912, 1914 or 1916, he remained active in Wisconsin and Socialist Party politics. Berger was especially involved in the biggest party controversy of the pre-war years, the fight between the SP's centrist "regular" bloc against the syndicalist left wing over the issue of "sabotage." The bitter battle erupted in full force at the 1912 National Convention of the Socialist Party, to which Berger was again a delegate. At issue was language to be inserted into the party constitution which called for the expulsion of "any member of the party who opposes political action or advocates crime, sabotage, or other methods of violence as a weapon of the working class to aid in its emancipation." The debate was vitriolic, with Berger, somewhat unsurprisingly, stating the matter in its most bellicose form:

The regulars won the day handily at the Indianapolis convention of 1912, with a successful recall of IWW leader "Big Bill" Haywood from the SP's National Executive Committee and an exodus of disaffected left wingers following shortly thereafter. The remaining radicals in the party remembered bitterly Berger's role in this affair and the ill feelings continued to fester until erupting anew at the end of the decade.

World War I

Although Berger's views on World War I were complicated by the Socialist view and the difficulties surrounding his German heritage, he supported his party's stance against the war. When the United States entered the war and passed the Espionage Act of 1917, Berger's continued opposition made him a target. He and four other Socialists were indicted under the Espionage Act in February 1918. The trial followed on December 9 of that year, and on February 20, 1919, Berger was convicted and sentenced to 20 years in federal prison.

During the 1918 Wisconsin special Senate election, Berger ran for the seat under federal indictment. His newspaper, the Milwaukee Leader, had printed a number of anti-war articles which led to the postal service revoking the paper's second-class mail privileges. Despite the circumstances, Berger won 26% of the vote statewide in an April special Senate election to fill a vacancy and won 11 counties in a three-way race.

The espionage trial was presided over by Judge Kenesaw Mountain Landis, who later became the first commissioner of Major League Baseball. His conviction was appealed and was ultimately overturned by the US Supreme Court on January 31, 1921, which found that Judge Landis had improperly presided over the case after the filing of an affidavit of prejudice.

Although he was under indictment, the voters of Milwaukee elected Berger to the House of Representatives in 1918. When he arrived in Washington to claim his seat, Congress formed a special committee to determine whether a convicted felon and war opponent should be seated as a member of Congress. On November 10, 1919, they concluded that he should not, and they declared the seat vacant. He was disqualified pursuant to Section 3 of the Fourteenth Amendment to the United States Constitution. Wisconsin promptly held a special election to fill the vacant seat and, on December 19, 1919, elected Berger a second time. On January 10, 1920, the House again refused to seat him, and the seat remained vacant until 1921, when the Republican William H. Stafford claimed the seat after defeating Berger in the 1920 general election.

Second stint in Congress
Berger defeated Stafford in 1922 and was reelected in 1924 and 1926. In those terms, he dealt with Constitutional changes, a proposed old-age pension, unemployment insurance, and public housing. He also supported the diplomatic recognition of the Soviet Union and the revision of the Treaty of Versailles. After his defeat by Stafford in 1928, he returned to Milwaukee and resumed his career as a newspaper editor.

Death
On July 16, 1929, while crossing the street outside his newspaper office, Berger was struck by a streetcar travelling on North Third Street (now Dr. Martin Luther King Drive) at the intersection with West Clarke Street in Milwaukee.  The accident fractured his skull, and he died of his injuries on August 7, 1929. Prior to burial at Forest Home Cemetery his body lay in state at City Hall. 75,000 residents of the city came to pay their respect.

Legacy
According to historian Sally Miller:
Berger built the most successful socialist machine ever to dominate an American city....[He] concentrated on national politics...to become one of the most powerful voices in the reformist wing of the national Socialist party. His commitment to democratic values and the non-violent socialization of the American system led the party away from revolutionary Marxist dogma. He shaped the party into force which, while struggling against its own left wing, symbolize participation in the political order to attain social reforms.... In the party schism of 1919, Berger opposed allegiance to the emergent Soviet system. His shrunken party echoed his preference for peaceful, democratic, and gradual transformation to socialism.

Berger's papers are housed at the Wisconsin Historical Society, with smaller numbers of items dispersed to other locations.
The complete run of the Milwaukee Leader exists on microfilm published by the Wisconsin Historical Society and on site at the University of Wisconsin in Madison.

Works
Victor Berger's writing was voluminous, but rarely reproduced in book or pamphlet form outside of the newspapers in which it first appeared. In 1912, the Social-Democratic Publishing Co published a collection of his works in a publication entitled Berger's Broadsides. In 1929, the Milwaukee Leader published the Voice and Pen of Victor L. Berger: Congressional Speeches and Editorials (1860–1929)  which also included an obituary. This publication included Berger's phrase regarding draining the swamp in reference to his assertion that the economic crises such as the Panic of 1893, were "hastened' by excessive profits—the $900,000,000 to  Standard Oil "magnates." According to Daniel Yergin in his Pulitzer Prize-winning The Prize: The Epic Quest for Oil, Money, and Power (1990), at the time the general public considered the Standard Oil conglomerate which was controlled by a small group of directors to be "all-pervasive" and "completely unaccountable".

See also
Meyer London
Espionage Act of 1917
First Red Scare
List of Jewish members of the United States Congress
Palmer Raids
Sewer Socialism
Socialist Party of America
Social-Democratic Party of Wisconsin
Unseated members of the United States Congress

Footnotes

Further reading
 Beck, Elmer A. The Sewer Socialists: A History of the Socialist Party of Wisconsin, 1897–1940. (2 vols.) Fennimore, WI: Westburg, 1982.
 Benoit, Edward A. "A Democracy of Its Own: Milwaukee's Socialisms, Difference and Pragmatism". Thesis. University of Wisconsin-Milwaukee, 2009.

 Kates, James. "Editor, publisher, citizen, socialist: Victor L. Berger and his Milwaukee Leader." Journalism History 44.2 (2018): 79-88. online
 Kipnis, Ira. The American Socialist Movement, 1897–1912. New York: Columbia University Press, 1952.
 Miller, Sally M. Victor Berger and the Promise of Constructive Socialism, 1910-1920 (Greenwood Press, 1973).
 Miller, Sally M. "Victor L. Berger and the Promise of Constructive Socialism, 1910-1920" (PhD dissertation, University of Toronto; ProQuest Dissertations Publishing, 1966. NK00653).

 Muzik, Edward J. "Victor L. Berger: A Biography". (Ph.D. dissertation, Northwestern University, 1960;  ProQuest Dissertations Publishing,  1960. 6004782).
 Muzik, Edward J. "Victor L. Berger: Congress and the Red Scare". Wisconsin Magazine of History, vol. 47, no. 4 (Summer 1964). 

 Nash, Roderick. "Victor L. Berger: Making Marx Respectable". Wisconsin Magazine of History, vol. 47, no. 4 (Summer 1964).
 Quint, Howard H. The Forging of American Socialism: Origins of the Modern Movement. Columbia: University of South Carolina Press, 1953.
 Wachman, Marvin. History of the Social Democratic Party of Milwaukee, 1897–1910. Urbana: University of Illinois Press, 1945.

Primary sources
 Berger, Victor L. "A Leading American Socialist's View Of the Peace Problem." Current History 27.4 (1928): 471-477. online
 Stedman, Seymour. "Victor L. Berger [and Others] Plaintiffs in Error, Vs. United States of America, Defendant in Error: Error to the District Court of the United States for the Northern District of Illinois, Eastern Division. Brief for Plaintiffs in Error" (1918) online.

 Stevens, Michael E. & Ellen D. Goldlust-Gingrich,(eds.). The Family Letters of Victor and Meta Berger, 1894–1929. Madison: Wisconsin Historical Society, 2009.

External links

 Victor Berger Archive at marxists.org
 
 
 Representative Victor Berger of Wisconsin, the First Socialist Member of Congress U.S. House of Representatives Archives
 "Burgher Berger.", Time Magazine, Aug. 19, 1929.
 Dreier, Peter. "Why Has Milwaukee Forgotten Victor Berger?"
 Glende, Philip M. "Victor Berger's Dangerous Ideas"
 Harrison, Emily. "The Case of Victor L. Berger: Drawing the Line Between Dissent and Disloyalty"
 Spargo, John. "Hon. Victor L. Berger: The First Socialist Member of Congress," The American Magazine, 1911.
 House Member Introduces Resolution to Abolish the Senate
 
 Constitutional Minutes episode about Victor Berger at the American Archive of Public Broadcasting

|-

|-

1860 births
1929 deaths
19th-century American newspaper editors
20th-century American newspaper editors
American anti-capitalists
American anti–World War I activists
American people of Romanian-Jewish descent
Austro-Hungarian emigrants to the United States
Austro-Hungarian Jews
Editors of Wisconsin newspapers
History of Wisconsin
Jewish American people in Wisconsin politics
Jewish American trade unionists
Jewish members of the United States House of Representatives
Jewish socialists
Members of the Executive of the Labour and Socialist International
Members of the United States House of Representatives from Wisconsin
Members of the United States House of Representatives removed by contest
Non-interventionism
Pedestrian road incident deaths
People acquitted under the Espionage Act of 1917
Politicians from Milwaukee
Road incident deaths in Wisconsin
Social Democratic Party of America politicians
Socialist Party of America politicians from Wisconsin
Socialist Party of America members of the United States House of Representatives from Wisconsin
Wisconsin State Federation of Labor people